The Midsummer Station is the fourth studio album by American electronica project Owl City. It was released on August 17, 2012, by Universal Republic Records.

Writing and development
After Owl City's previous album, All Things Bright and Beautiful (2011), sold 143,000 copies in the United States, Adam Young began working on demo tracks for The Midsummer Station in January 2012. Unlike his previous albums, Young worked with different songwriters and producers for the first time, including Stargate and Emily Wright. However, Young again collaborated with Matthew Thiessen for his third album in a row along with Ocean Eyes and All Things Bright and Beautiful.  Young was initially scared of the thought of collaborating with others, "I've never worked with anybody before. I've done everything myself except for mastering. It's a big job for one guy, especially a perfectionist, so I knew I wanted to try to experiment with other people." The song "Dementia", which features Blink-182 singer Mark Hoppus, was mixed by Chris Lord-Alge.

On May 15, 2012, Young released the Shooting Star extended play, which consisted of four songs that would be featured on The Midsummer Station. Many criticized Shooting Star, saying it was very different from Young's previous works. On his blog, Young defended his choice for the new sound of the extended play and the album, stating that he believes "it's a bummer for an artist of any kind to hear, 'Yeah it's great but it's a lot like your previous work.' (...) Creativity is all about pushing boundaries and pressing onward". In an interview with PureVolume, Young stated that the tracks on this record are much darker, with more influence of his own dreams, nightmares and self-reflection.

The album was originally planned to have a release date of August 14, 2012, worldwide, apart from the United Kingdom where it would be released on September 17, 2012. On June 21, 2012, it was announced that the worldwide release date would be pushed back to August 21, 2012. On July 12, 2012, Young announced that the UK release date would be brought forward to August 20, 2012. The album was released on August 17 in other countries including Australia.

Artwork
The artwork was created by Gediminas Pranckevicius in 2009.
Pranckevicius' artwork often explores the struggle between man and nature by combining man-made structures with flora and fauna, all coexisting in a forced, urban manner. In Time, there are multiple juxtapositions at work. Beneath the surface is the vertical, wooden shantytown, neatly residing next to a vertical lake in which a very large fish swims. The shanty is illuminated, detailed and clear. By contrast, the waters are dark and murky. Above the busy shanty town is a solitary tree on a serene grassland and a solitary man in a boat on the lake. Everything surrounding the shanty is simple and peaceful. The shanty, though great to look at, is chaotic and saturated. It is only a matter of time before the human settlement expands above the surface or invades the water.

Around February-March 2012, Young discovered the artwork while browsing Tumblr and e-mailed his manager to assist in tracking down the original artist. After a short discussion regarding the usage of the artwork, Pranckevicius allowed Young to use the artwork on the front cover of the album.

Singles
The EP's title track, "Shooting Star", was intended to be the lead single from The Midsummer Station, but the Carly Rae Jepsen collaboration "Good Time" was chosen instead, due to the success of Jepsen's "Call Me Maybe".

"Good Time" was released on June 26, 2012, and peaked at No. 8 on the Billboard Hot 100.

Reception

Critical response

The album received mixed reviews from music critics upon its release. As of December 9, 2013, the album received an average score of 52 based on 11 reviews at Metacritic, which assigns a normalized rating out of 100 to reviews from mainstream critics, which indicates "mixed or average reviews".

Commercial performance
The Midsummer Station debuted at No. 7 on the Billboard 200 in the United States, with first-week sales of 30,000 copies. Digital downloads accounted for 72 percent of the album's first-week total. In the United Kingdom the album debuted at No. 34, selling 3,281 copies in its first week.

Track listing

Personnel
Credits adapted from the liner notes of The Midsummer Station.

Owl City
 Adam Young – vocals, drum programming, keyboards, piano, celeste, synthesizers, guitar, bass, lap steel, sampler, drums, percussion, glockenspiel, bells, accordion, loops

Additional musicians
 Mark Hoppus – additional vocals on track 4
 Carly Rae Jepsen – additional vocals on track 7
 The Minneapolis Youth Chorus – additional vocals on track 7
 Keith Kenniff – bowed double bass, synthesizer, drums on track 9
 Dustin Sauder – electric and acoustic guitars on track 3
 Chris Carmichael – violin, viola, cello on tracks 8 & 10
 Matthew Thiessen – background vocals on tracks 5 & 7
 Josh Crosby – additional drums, keyboards, programming, background vocals on track 3
 Mikkel S. Eriksen – guitar, bass, keyboards on track 2
 Tor Erik Hermansen – additional keyboards, programming on track 2
 Kool Kojak – additional keyboards, programming on track 11

Additional personnel
 Gediminas Pranckevicius – cover artwork

Charts

References

2012 albums
Albums produced by Stargate
Owl City albums
Universal Republic Records albums